Athrips medjella is a moth of the family Gelechiidae. It is found in southern France.

The wingspan is about 14 mm. The forewings are covered with grey brown, lighter-tipped scales. There is a small black spot in the fold and one oblique above in the cell. A large spot is found at the middle of wing at two-thirds and there are some black scales on the termen. The hindwings are grey. Adults are on wing in July.

The larvae feed on Cotoneaster integerrimus.

References

Moths described in 1900
Athrips
Moths of Europe